Uganda sent a delegation to compete at the 2000 Summer Paralympics in Sydney, Australia. The country  entered only one athlete, who competed in swimming. She did not win a medal.

Swimming

Prossy Tusabe, Uganda's only representative, competed in the women's 100m freestyle (S10 category). She finished last in her heat, her time of 2:12.45 far behind that of the second slowest overall (the United States's Karen Noris, in 1:09.37). Thus she did not advance to the final.

See also
 Uganda at the 2000 Summer Olympics

References

External links
International Paralympic Committee official website

Nations at the 2000 Summer Paralympics
2000
Paralympics